Ras Karkar is a Palestinian village in the Ramallah and al-Bireh Governorate, located  northwest of Ramallah in the northern West Bank. According to the Palestinian Central Bureau of Statistics (PCBS), the town had a population of 1,663 inhabitants in 2007.

Location
Ras Karkar is bordered by Al Janiya  to the east, Al-Itihad to the north, Kharbatha Bani Harith to the west, and Kafr Ni'ma to the south.

History
Potsherds from the Hellenistic, Mamluk and early Ottoman era have been found.

Ottoman era
The village, also known as Ras Ibn Samhan, is topped with a castle on a high, rocky and sharply sloping mountain surrounded by cactus trees. One of the many throne villages (a central village dominated by a semi-feudal family which controlled tens of villages around it) in Palestine, the castle of the Samhan family, erected in 18th or 19th century, is the subject of a preservation effort, and provides proof of the great power and wealth held by its owners at the time.

The chief Sheikh of the Simhan family was Isma'il, who was killed by Ibrahim Pasha in the 1834 uprising. After  Isma'il, Hasan es-Sa'id and Mohammah ibn Isma'il became the rulers.

Edward Robinson passed by in 1838, and described the place as "a castle". It was also noted as a Muslim  village,   located in the Beni Harith district, west of Jerusalem.

Ras Karkar was ruled by Sheikh Ismail Ibn Samhan who was respected and appreciated by his clan for the many contributions and support that he provided. Sheikh Ismail was killed by the Abu Ghosh family which controlled another throne village near Ras Karkar, and the castle was handed over to his nephew Hussein.

An Ottoman village list from about 1870 showed that   Ras Karkar had  16 houses and a population of 74, though the population count included men only.   

In 1882 the PEF's Survey of Western Palestine (SWP) described Ras Kerker as "a small village in a lofty position, with a spring below it on the north. In the middle of the village is a fortress built about 50 year since. The place was the seat of the great native family of Beni Simhan."

In 1896 the population of Er-Ras was estimated to be about 210 persons.

British Mandate era
In the  1922 census of Palestine conducted by the British Mandate authorities, Ras Kerker  had a population of 209 Muslims,  increasing in the 1931 census to 291  Muslims, in a total of 75 houses.

In the 1945 statistics, the population was 340 Muslims,  while the total land area was 5,883 dunams, according to an official land and population survey. Of  this,  3,366 were allocated  for plantations and irrigable land, 1,237  for cereals, while 12 dunams were classified as built-up areas.

Jordanian era
In the wake of the 1948 Arab–Israeli War, and after the 1949 Armistice Agreements,  Ras Karkar  came under Jordanian rule.

In 1961, the population of Ras Karkar was  478.

post-1967
After the Six-Day War in 1967,  Ras Karkar has been under Israeli occupation. 

The population of Ras Karker in the 1967 census conducted by the Israeli authorities was 399, 19 of whom originated from the Israeli territory. 

After the 1995 accords, 18.6%  of Ras Karkar's land was classified as Area B, while the remaining 81.4% is Area C. Israel has  confiscated land from Ras Karkar for the establishment of the Israeli outpost "Zayt Ra'nan", and for the construction of roads leading to the Israeli settlement of Talmon.

The majestic castle is surrounded with historic buildings, overlooking to the west the mountains leading to the Mediterranean Sea and to the south, the city of Jerusalem. The village fields below are planted with olive trees.

Entering the now abandoned castle from the northern gate leads to a large courtyard surrounded by a row of rooms. Al-Iliyeh, which is the highest room in the three-floor castle, was used for administrative purposes and as the Sheikh's private refuge. Narrow hallways and oil storage containers, as well as decorations and poems carved in the castle's walls and stones are among the things one can see there.

Naby Annir
Just north of Ras Karkar is Neby Annir, meaning "The prophet Annir". According to Tawfiq Canaan, writing in  1927, this place (called en−Nebi 'Annir in Beni Harit) was formerly a place of pilgrimage (mawasim), taking place about the same time as the Nabi Musa religious festival; at the Djum'et el-'Alemat, or Feast of the Flags, on Good Friday.

References

Bibliography

External links
 Welcome To Ras Karkar
Survey of Western Palestine, Map 14:  IAA, Wikimedia commons 
Ras Karkar Village (Fact Sheet),  Applied Research Institute–Jerusalem (ARIJ)
Ras Karkar Village Profile, ARIJ
Ras Karkar  aerial photo, ARIJ 
Locality Development Priorities and Needs in Ras Karkar Village, ARIJ
 Throne villages, with Ibn Sahman Castle, Ras Karkar, RIWAQ

Villages in the West Bank
Ramallah and al-Bireh Governorate
Throne villages
Municipalities of the State of Palestine